Langsee or Längsee may refer to:
Längsee (Kärnten), a lake of Carinthia, Austria
Längsee (Tyrol), a lake of Tyrol, Austria
Langsee (Schleswig), a lake in Angeln, Kreis Schleswig-Flensburg, Schleswig-Holstein, Germany
Langsee (Mecklenburg), a lake in the Rostock district in Mecklenburg-Vorpommern, Germany